Gerd Backhaus (born 8 September 1942) is a German former professional footballer who played as a striker.

In all his senior playing career Backhaus wore the jersey of BSG Lokomotive Stendal.

He scored in each of his first two international appearances for East Germany.

Career statistics

International goals

References

External links
International career

1942 births
Living people
German footballers
East German footballers
East Germany international footballers
Association football forwards
Olympic footballers of the United Team of Germany
Olympic bronze medalists for the United Team of Germany
Olympic medalists in football
Footballers at the 1964 Summer Olympics
Medalists at the 1964 Summer Olympics
DDR-Oberliga players
1. FC Lok Stendal players